Heinz-Günter Wittmann (1 January 1927 – 31 March 1990) was a German biochemist known for his research in ribosomes.

References
 

1927 births
1990 deaths
German biochemists
People from East Prussia
People from Giżycko County